Mordovia is a republic of Russia. It is divided into 22 districts called raions. The city of Saransk is administrated separately from the districts as an urban okrug.

Administrative and municipal divisions

References

Geography of Mordovia
Mordovia